Only in America may refer to:

Film and TV
 Only in America (TV series), a BBC children's television programme 
 Only in America with Larry the Cable Guy, an American reality TV show

Music
 Only in Amerika, a 2004 album by Hed PE
 Only in America (Jay and the Americans song)
 Only in America (Brooks & Dunn song)